Donatus, Prince and Landgrave of Hesse (legally Heinrich Donatus Philipp Umberto Prinz und Landgraf von Hessen; born 17 October 1966) is the head of the House of Brabant and the German House of Hesse. He is the eldest son and successor of German aristocrat Moritz, Landgrave of Hesse, and his former wife, Princess Tatiana of Sayn-Wittgenstein-Berleburg. A great-grandson of Victor Emmanuel III of Italy, he is named in part after Georg Donatus, Hereditary Grand Duke of Hesse. He is also a descendant of Queen Victoria of the United Kingdom, and of Frederick III, German Emperor. He is a distant cousin of Prince Philip, Duke of Edinburgh, whose funeral he attended. The two are related through the Duke's British-born mother and a Princess of Battenberg by birth, Princess Alice of Greece and Denmark. Donatus also attended the state funeral of Queen Elizabeth II at Westminster Abbey, London, on 19 September, 2022 with his wife, Floria.

Profession
Donatus directs the Hessische Hausstiftung (Foundation of the House of Hesse), a foundation (see below) established to curate and showcase the cultural heritage and history of the House of Hesse, a dynasty which ruled the Electorate of Hesse-Cassel until 1866, the Grand Duchy of Hesse and by Rhine until 1918, and whose male-line antecedents and co-lateral ties include the Protestant leader Philip the Magnanimous, the Swedish king Frederick I, Russia's last tsarina Alexandra Feodorovna, the exiled Spanish queen Victoria Eugenie of Battenberg, and Britain's last viceroy of India, the assassinated Louis, Earl Mountbatten of Burma.

Donatus also manages Prinz von Hessen, a winery specializing in production of varietal vintages on his 45 hectare vineyard.

Prince Donatus's father became the head of the Hesse-Cassel line on the death of his own father, Landgrave Philipp in 1980. Having also been the adopted son and heir of his distant cousin, Louis, Prince of Hesse and by Rhine, the latter's death in 1968 as the last male of the Hesse-Darmstadt branch left Moritz head of the entire House of Hesse, to which Donatus is the successor.

Marriage and issue
Donatus married Countess Floria Franziska Marie-Luisa Erika von Faber-Castell (born 14 October 1974 Düsseldorf) in a civil ceremony in Wiesbaden on 25 April 2003. The bride is a communications professional and a niece of Count Anton Wolfgang von Faber-Castell, chairman of the board of the famous Faber-Castell pen-and-pencil company headquartered near Nuremberg and scion of the eponymous family, which is a morganatic branch of the Castell-Rüdenhausen Princely family. Prince Donatus and Floria Franziska are 6th cousins, as both descended from Frederick II, Landgrave of Hesse-Kassel and his first wife Princess Mary of Great Britain.

The couple's religious wedding ceremony took place on 17 May 2003, attended by royalty and aristocrats. Held at the Johanneskirche and followed by a grand ball in the Green Salon, state room of the former Friedrichshof palace in Kronberg (now a luxury hotel and golf course owned by the House of Hesse's family foundation) where Donatus's ancestress, the German Empress Frederick, Princess Royal of the United Kingdom, lived in widowhood, more than 300 guests were present. Among them was Caroline, Princess of Hanover, Princess Benedikte of Denmark, aunt of the bridegroom and sister of Queens Margrethe II and Anne-Marie of Greece; and Gloria, Princess of Thurn and Taxis.

Landgrave Donatus and his wife have a daughter and two sons:
Princess Paulina Elizabeth Adelhaid Tatiana Suzanne (born 26 March 2007, Frankfurt am Main, Germany) twin sister of Moritz 
 Hereditary Prince Moritz Ludwig Georg Wolf (born 26 March 2007, Frankfurt am Main, Germany) twin brother of Paulina
Prince August Siegfried Hubertus Felix (born 24 August 2012, Frankfurt am Main, Germany).

Representative appearances 
In 2021, Donatus was one of only 30 mourners at Prince Philip, the Duke of Edinburgh's, funeral at St George's Chapel, Windsor Castle. He also attended the state funeral of Queen Elizabeth II at Westminster Abbey, London, on 19 September 2022. King Charles III appointed Donatus his personal representative to the funeral of his first cousin Maximilian, Margrave of Baden, on 13 January 2023.

Although, as a descendant of Queen Victoria, he is only a distant relative of today's British royals who are more closely related to some other princes of Hesse, descendants of Prince Philip's sister Sophie, there is a close connection to the British royal family through Donatus' adoptive grandparents, Louis, Prince of Hesse and by Rhine, and his wife Margaret Campbell Geddes, who were relatives and close friends of Queen Elizabeth II and Prince Philip, as Philip's sister Cecilie had been married to Louis' elder brother Georg Donatus, Hereditary Grand Duke of Hesse.  The late Queen, Prince Philip and Charles (then Prince of Wales) have visited Wolfsgarten on several occasions.

Ancestry

Foundation of the House of Hesse
Founded in 1928, the Foundation of the House of Hesse is the successor institution of a family trust that had been established in 1830, confiscated by the Kingdom of Prussia in 1866, and re-established after partial restitution in 1878. The foundation manages the family fortunes including forests, agricultural estates, castles, hotels and an art collection.  The latter is mainly shown at Fasanerie Palace in Eichenzell, Hesse, a former summer palace of the Prince Abbots of Fulda that had been taken over by the Landgraves of Hesse after the secularization and mediatisation of the Prince-bishopric of Fulda in 1803. Schlosshotel Kronberg and (until 2020) Grandhotel Hessischer Hof in Frankfurt are hotels operated by the foundation, the Weingut Prinz von Hessen a winery in Johannisberg which was purchased in 1957, while Schloß Wolfsgarten south of Frankfurt am Main and Panker estate in Schleswig-Holstein are used as private seats of the family. Other castles have been sold, such as Schloss Philippsruhe in Hanau (in 1950), Schloss Rumpenheim in Offenbach am Main (in 1965) and Tarasp Castle in Switzerland (in 2016). The Landgrave and his family live in Wolfsgarten and Panker.

References and notes

|-

|-

|-

|-

1966 births
Living people
House of Hesse-Kassel
German royalty